Jack Oatey  (29 August 1920 – 26 February 1994) was an Australian rules football player and coach.

Playing career
Oatey played 181 games for the Norwood Football Club between 1940 and 1952 and acted as playing-coach from 1945 to 1952.

While on service for World War II in 1944, he played 5 games for the South Melbourne Football Club.

Coaching career
Following his retirement from playing in 1952, Oatey remained the coach of Norwood until 1956. In 1957, Oatey moved to West Adelaide where he coached until 1960, reaching the finals each year but never winning the premiership. Not involved in coaching at any team in 1961, Oatey saw the Bloods win the SANFL premiership, convincing him to return to the league. He went to Sturt, coaching there from 1962 to 1982, and leading the league team to seven SANFL Premierships (a record at the time) including the famous five in a row from 1966 to 1970.

A long-standing coaching rival to Port Adelaide's Fos Williams, Sturt defeated Port Adelaide four times in Grand Finals under Oatey's tutelage.

Through his time at Sturt, Oatey was one of the early instigators of the greater use of handball as an attacking option, which is often apocryphally attributed to the VFL's Ron Barassi, particularly within Victoria. It was a major contributor to Sturt's success through the 1960s. He also encouraged the use of the checkside punt for wide-angle goalkicking, and was strong at encouraging skills development and team play.

He was inducted into the Australian Football Hall of Fame in 1996. Overall, Oatey coached 37 seasons in the SANFL, winning ten premierships (three with Norwood, seven with Sturt), reaching seventeen grand finals (six with Norwood, two with West Adelaide and nine with Sturt) and reaching the finals on 33 occasions. His ten premierships is still the record for the most premierships by one coach in elite Australian rules football.

Accolades
Jack Oatey is the only person in elite Australian rules football history to coach over 500 wins. He coached Norwood, West Adelaide and Sturt to a total of 521 wins and five draws from a record 786 matches (153 of these were as playing coach for Norwood) for an overall success rate of 66.6%. He coached a record ten premierships.

Oatey was awarded Life Membership of the Norwood Football Club, was awarded Life Membership of the Sturt Football Club in 1971 and SANFL Life Membership in 1981.

In 1981 the SANFL inaugurated the Jack Oatey Medal to be awarded to the best player in the SANFL grand final, the first time an SANFL award was named for a still active coach.

In the 1978 Queen's Birthday Honours, Oatey was appointed Member of the Order of Australia (AM) for services to the sport of Australian football.

Jack Oatey was an inaugural inductee into the Australian Football Hall of Fame in 1996 and was elevated to Legend status in 2021, becoming only the second Legend to have played and coached his entire career in the SANFL. In 2002, he was one of 113 inaugural inductees into the South Australian Football Hall of Fame.

A stand was named after him at the Adelaide Oval in 2014.

Sampson Hosking said of Jack Oatey in 1950 that "I have great respect for him as a coach. He's the best defensive captain I've ever seen".

Family
Oatey's eldest son Robert Oatey also played for and coached Norwood and later became a highly respected television commentator for Channel 7 and Channel 10's SANFL coverage in the 1980s, teaming with Bruce McAvaney, Ian Day, Peter Marker and Graham Campbell. Jack's youngest son Peter, was both a Norwood footballer and tennis player.

References

External links

SA Football Hall of Fame - Jack Oatey AM
Norwood Football Club Hall of Fame - Jack Oatey

Norwood Football Club coaches
Norwood Football Club players
Sturt Football Club coaches
West Adelaide Football Club coaches
Australian Football Hall of Fame inductees
Sydney Swans players
Australian military personnel of World War II
Australian rules footballers from South Australia
Members of the Order of Australia
South Australian Football Hall of Fame inductees
1920 births
1994 deaths
Military personnel from South Australia